Anteo Osmanllari (born 11 October 1998) is an Albanian professional footballer who plays as a forward  for KF Erzeni in the Abissnet Superiore.

Club career

Early career
Osmanllari started his youth career at KF Skënderbeu Korçë in the summer of 2013 as a 14 year old and was eventually promoted to the under-19 side ahead of the 2016–17 campaign where he scored 10 goals in 26 games.

Skënderbeu Korçë
Osmanllari was promoted to the first team by Andrea Agostinelli, who handed the 17 year old his professional debut in the Albanian Cup against KF Butrinti Sarandë on 28 September 2016. He came on as a 60th-minute substitute for Anesti Pejo in what was an inexperienced side who struggled against lower league opposition in a 1–1 away draw.

Career statistics

Club

References

External links
 Anteo Osmanllari profile  FSHF.org
 

1998 births
Living people
Footballers from Korçë
Albanian footballers
Association football forwards
KF Skënderbeu Korçë players
KF Korabi Peshkopi players
KS Burreli players
KS Pogradeci players
Kategoria Superiore players
Kategoria e Parë players